Epsilon in Malaysian Pale, issued as Ypsilon in Malaysian Pale by Brain Records in Germany, is the second studio album by German recording artist Edgar Froese, released in 1975.

Recording and history
Epsilon in Malaysian Pale was recorded in June and July 1975, following Tangerine Dream's Australian tour, and was heavily influenced by the places they had visited whilst on the tour.

David Bowie named Epsilon in Malaysian Pale as an influence for his Berlin Trilogy albums Low, "Heroes" and Lodger. "It was the soundtrack of my life when I lived in Berlin", Bowie once said.

The album consists of two instrumental compositions, each originally filling one side of vinyl. The first, "Epsilon in Malaysian Pale", is a Mellotron-based piece inspired by Froese's visit to a Malaysian jungle. The second, "Maroubra Bay", is a more synthesiser-based piece named after a place in Australia. "Maroubra Bay" later appeared on the compilation album Electronic Dreams, but was accidentally recorded backwards for that particular album.

In 2004, Froese re-recorded and remixed the album in Vienna, releasing it on his own Eastgate label with a new cover based on that of the original.

Critical reception
Andy Beta of Pitchfork praised the album, calling it "wholly organic, subtle, and alive", and included it on Pitchfork list of the 50 best ambient albums of all time.

Track listing
 "Epsilon in Malaysian Pale" – 16:26
 "Maroubra Bay" – 17:00

References

1975 albums
Edgar Froese albums